Stepan Kubiv (Stepan Ivanovych Kubiv; born March 19, 1962) is a Ukrainian politician who was a former First Vice Prime Minister of Ukraine and simultaneously Minister of Economic Development and Trade of Ukraine from April 2016 to August 2019. He is also a former acting chairman of the National Bank of Ukraine.

Education 
1984 – graduated from Lviv State University named after Ivan Franko, faculty of mathematics

2002 – graduated from National University "Lviv Polytechnic", specialty Finance

2006 – defended his thesis, Ph.D. in Economics

2007 – Associate Professor, Marketing and Logistics Department, National University "Lviv Polytechnic", aftermath – academician

Career

Prior to convocation 
1983-1988 Researcher, Ivan Franko University in Lviv,

1988-1991 Youth worker, municipality of Lviv, director

1991-1994 Student union of Lviv, director

1994-2000 Western Ukrainian Commercial Bank, Chairman from 1997.

2000-2008 JSC Kredobank, Chairman

2008 to present, Associate Professor of Marketing and Logistics "Lviv Polytechnic".

From 2010 to 2012 Bank Supervisory Board.

Post convocation 
From December 12, 2012 parliament VII of Ukraine.

2013-2014 commander in the House of Trade Unions in Kyiv, during the mass anti-government protests in Ukraine.

24 February 2014, Chairman of the National Bank of Ukraine.

28 February 2014, Member of the National Security Council.

4 March 2014, Personal written statement of resignation - the Verkhovna Rada of Ukraine stopped prematurely powers of MPs in connection with a personal request of deputies' powers.

On 19 June 2014 Kubiv was replaced as Chairman of the National Bank of Ukraine by Valeriia Hontareva. He is reportedly tapped to be the next Chairman of Lviv Regional State Administration.

In the 2014 Ukrainian parliamentary election he was again re-elected into parliament; this time after placing 59th on the electoral list of Petro Poroshenko Bloc.

April 2016 - August 2019 -  Kubiv was the First Vice Prime Minister of Ukraine and simultaneously Minister of Economic Development and Trade of Ukraine.

In the parliamentary elections of 2019, Kubiv was elected as MP from the European Solidarity Party, No. 12 on the party list. Member of the Verkhovna Rada of Ukraine Committee on Economic Development. Member of the Ukrainian part of the interparliamentary assembly of the Verkhovna Rada of Ukraine, Parliament of Georgia, Parliament of the Republic of Moldova.

Awards 
Order "For merits" of III class.

Income 
For 2019, he declared a salary of UAH 646,216 and a 2012 Audi Q5 car.

References

External links
Official Site

People of the Euromaidan
Recipients of the Gold Cross of Merit (Poland)
Recipients of the Order of Merit (Ukraine), 3rd class
Governors of the National Bank of Ukraine
Seventh convocation members of the Verkhovna Rada
All-Ukrainian Union "Fatherland" politicians
Front for Change (Ukraine) politicians
Lviv Polytechnic alumni
University of Lviv alumni
People from Ternopil Oblast
1962 births
Living people
Petro Poroshenko Bloc politicians
Eighth convocation members of the Verkhovna Rada
First vice prime ministers of Ukraine
Ninth convocation members of the Verkhovna Rada
Laureates of the Honorary Diploma of the Verkhovna Rada of Ukraine